Thomas Foxen Anderson (February 7, 1911 – August 11, 1991) was an American biophysical chemist and geneticist who developed crucial techniques for using electron microscopes. Anderson pioneered use of the electron microscope to study viruses. His research produced insights of how viruses infect cells, methods of their reproduction and how they alter the cells they infect.

Anderson was elected to the National Academy of Sciences in 1964. Anderson was president of the International Federation of Electron Microscope Societies, president of the Biophysical Society, chairman of the United States National Committee of the International Union for Pure and Applied Biophysics, and chairman of the Genetics Section of the National Academy of Sciences.

Life 
Anderson was born in 1911 in Manitowoc, Wisconsin, to Anton Oliver Anderson, an electrical engineer, and Mabel Foxen, both the children of Norwegian immigrants. When he was a child, his brother, Norman, developed a chronic mastoiditis. After the death of his mother in 1920, Anton married a new wife, Edna Halvorsen, and began moving his family in 1923, in search of a better climate for the health of his sick son. They lived successively in four different locations: Tampa, Florida (1923-1924); Amherst, Wisconsin, (1924-1925); Rockford, Illinois (1925-1926); and Glendale, California, which is where they finally settled.

Anderson enrolled the California Institute of Technology for his higher studies, from which he received his bachelor's degree and doctorate in 1932 and 1936, respectively. He married Wilma Fay Ecton on December 28, 1937. He joined the faculty of the University of Pennsylvania in 1942, where he was named a professor of biology in 1958. He left the university in 1977 when he became director of the Fox Chase Cancer Center's postdoctoral training program for basic research. He retired in 1983.

A resident of Fox Chase, Pennsylvania, Anderson died on August 11, 1991 at Jeanes Hospital in Philadelphia, Pennsylvania, following a series of strokes. He was interred in Oak Grove Cemetery in Amherst, Wisconsin.

Awards 
 Guggenheim Fellowship, 1955 
 National Academy of Sciences, 1964 
 Distinguished Award of the Electron Microscope Society of America in 1978
 The Pasteur Institute’s Silver Medal in 1957

References

External links
National Academy of Sciences Biographical Memoir

1911 births
1991 deaths
People from Manitowoc, Wisconsin
American people of Norwegian descent
People from Glendale, California
California Institute of Technology alumni
American biochemists
American geneticists
Scientists from Philadelphia
University of Pennsylvania faculty
Members of the United States National Academy of Sciences
Educators from Pennsylvania
Presidents of the International Federation of Societies for Microscopy
Presidents of the Biophysical Society